Bircher may refer to:

People
Bircher (surname)

Places
Bircher, Herefordshire, a hamlet in England

See also
Birchers, the John Birch Society
Burcher (disambiguation)